Diego Yesso (born 26 November 1984) is a French former professional footballer who played as a midfielder.

Career
Yesso was born in Ploemeur. He played on the professional level in Ligue 1 and Ligue 2 for FC Lorient.

Notes

External links
 Profile at foot-national.com
 

Living people
1984 births
People from Ploemeur
Sportspeople from Morbihan
Association football midfielders
French footballers
Ligue 1 players
Ligue 2 players
Villemomble Sports players
US Avranches players
FC Lorient players
Pau FC players
US Concarneau players
French people of Malian descent
Footballers from Brittany